Marcelo Roberto Lima de Mattos (born October 24, 1986), known as Marcelinho, is a Brazilian football player who plays as attacking midfielder.

Honours
Santa Catarina State League: 2006

Contract
Náutico (Loan) 1 January 2008 to 30 April 2008
Atlético-PR 1 February 2006 to 30 June 2009

References

External links
  
 Marcelinho (Marcelo Roberto Lima de Mattos) at BDFA.com.ar 
 furacao 
 furacao 
  

1986 births
Living people
Brazilian footballers
Club Athletico Paranaense players
Clube Atlético Sorocaba players
Figueirense FC players
Clube Náutico Capibaribe players
Esporte Clube Internacional de Lages players
Association football midfielders